Bryant J. Salter (born January 22, 1950) is a former American football safety in the National Football League (NFL) for the San Diego Chargers, Washington Redskins, Baltimore Colts, and the Miami Dolphins.  He played college football at the University of Pittsburgh and was drafted in the fifth round of the 1971 NFL Draft. He went on to join the United States Foreign Service and eventually served as a consul in Mexico and chargé d’affaires to Antigua and Barbuda and Saint Kitts and Nevis from January 1991 until March 1994.  He would also receive a master's degree from the Harvard Kennedy School.

References

1950 births
Living people
American football safeties
Players of American football from Pittsburgh
Pittsburgh Panthers football players
San Diego Chargers players
Washington Redskins players
Baltimore Colts players
Miami Dolphins players
Ambassadors of the United States to Antigua and Barbuda
Ambassadors of the United States to Saint Kitts and Nevis
Harvard Kennedy School alumni
United States Foreign Service personnel